Stanton Township may refer to:

 Stanton Township, Champaign County, Illinois
 Stanton Township, Plymouth County, Iowa
 Stanton Township, Linn County, Kansas, in Linn County, Kansas
 Stanton Township, Miami County, Kansas, in Miami County, Kansas
 Stanton Township, Ottawa County, Kansas, in Ottawa County, Kansas
 Stanton Township, Stanton County, Kansas, in Stanton County, Kansas
 Stanton Township, Houghton County, Michigan
 Stanton Township, Goodhue County, Minnesota
 Stanton Township, Antelope County, Nebraska
 Stanton Township, Fillmore County, Nebraska
 Stanton Township, Wilkes County, North Carolina, in Wilkes County, North Carolina

See also

Stanton (disambiguation)

Township name disambiguation pages